Norway Rocks is a reef of rocks, the charted position of which is doubtful, reported to extend about 4 nautical miles (7 km) southward from Bernacchi Head, Franklin Island, in the Ross Sea. Discovered in 1841 by Ross. Named by C.E. Borchgrevink, a native of Norway, leader of the British Antarctic Expedition, 1898–1900.

Reefs of Antarctica
Landforms of Victoria Land
Scott Coast